The Best Kids... Ever! is a compilation released by EMI in 2008. It contains songs for children. Songs were recorded by Polish artists only.

Track listing

CD 1
Krzysztof Marzec i Fasolki- "Pan Tik-Tak"   
Akademia Pana Kleksa- "Kaczka dziwaczka"   
Budzik- "Latający odkurzacz"   
Lady Pank- "Dwuosobowa banda"   
Domisie- "Domisie na dzień dobry"   
Ewa Złotowska- "Co się stało z Pszczółką Mają"
Natalia Kukulska- "Puszek okruszek"   
Majka Jeżowska- "A ja wolę moją mamę"   
Tęczowy Music Box- Gabrysia Owsiak- "Jestem Gabrysia"   
Zygzaki- "Idę w tany bez mamy"   
Zbigniew Wodecki- "Pszczółka Maja"   
Kulfon i Monika- "Kulfon, co z Ciebie wyrośnie?"   
Domowe Przedszkole- "Kolorowe kredki"   
Magda Fronczewska- "Myszka widziała ostatnia"   
Fasolki- "Witaminki dla chłopczyka i dziewczynki"   
Kaczki Z Nowej Paczki- "Dziubdziub"   
Króliczek Titou- "Kuku, Titou"

CD 2
Wesołe Nutki- "Stary niedźwiedź mocno śpi"   
Korniki- "Zielone żabki"   
Majka Jeżowska- "Guma do podskoków"   
Gawęda- "A ja mam psa"   
Domisie- "Domisiowa skakanka"   
Natalia Nocoń & Biedronki- "Dźwiękołapka"   
Rass Tomi & Dzieciuff Squad- "Piosenka skakanka"   
Zespół Dziecięcy Gong- "Koci, koci łapci"   
Michał Bajor- "Na straganie"   
Piotruś Wieczorek i Kasia Szczęsna- "Domowa piosenka"   
Arfik- "Jak ja się nazywam"   
Kasia Klich- "Kółko graniaste"   
Wesołe Podwórko- "Każdy swoje imię ma"   
Radiowe Nutki- "Najłatwiejsze ciasto w świecie"   
Ola Pawłowska- "Kropka"   
Zespół Dziecięcy Gong- "Wlazł kotek na płotek"   
Tomek Góralski i Dominik Fołta- "Chciałbym być kowbojem"

CD 3
Domisie- "Łazienkowe czary-mary"   
Asia Siedlicka i Kasia Murawska- "Mydło lubi zabawę"  
Wesołe Podwórko- "Z jak zdrowie"   
Wesołe Nutki- "Pieski małe dwa"   
Wesołe Podwórko- "Idą buty do przedszkola"   
Joanna Jabłczyńska i Fasolki- "Myj zęby"   
Wesołe Podwórko- "Piosenka o czasie"   
Wesołe Podwórko- "Zabawa w chodzenie"   
Wesołe Podwórko- "To auto, a to auta dwa"   
Korniki- "Cztery zielone słonie"   
Wesołe Podwórko- "Hartuj ciało"   
Kasia Klich- "Stokrotka"   
Wesołe Nutki- "Jadą, jadą misie"   
Aktorzy Teatru Rampa- "Lekcja języków"   
Wesołe Podwórko- "Dzieci i światła"   
Zespół Dziecięcy Gong- "Krasnoludki"   
Gawęda- "Bugi-ługi dla papugi"   
Jacek Jarosz- "Do trzech razy sztuka"   
Ewa Bem- "Znaki drogowe"   
Korniki- "Alfabetynka"

CD 4
Magda Umer & Grzegorz Turnau- "Bajka iskierki"   
Anita Lipnicka- "Uśnijże mi, uśnij"   
Magda Umer- "Śpij kochanie"   
Marek Grechuta- "Śpij - bajki śnij"   
Ewa Bem- "Idzie niebo ciemną nocą"   
Justyna Steczkowska- "Już idziemy spać"   
Arfik- "Zwyczajna kołysanka"   
Krzysztof Krawczyk- "Dla Krzysia"   
Orkiestra Dni Naszych- "Kołysaneczka"   
Zespół Dziecięcy Gong- "A, a, kotki dwa"   
Zuzia Czerniak- "Smutna kołysanka"   
Grzegorz Turnau- "W muszelkach Twoich dłoni"   
Wesołe Podwórko- "Kocia kołysanka"   
Kornelia Włodarczyk i Rass Tomi & Dzieciuff Squad- "Kołysanka dla Fryderyka"   
Kasia Liebhen i Zespół Tęcza- "Piosenka do poduszki"   
Majka Jeżowska- "Kołysanka dla Michałka"   
Seweryn Krajewski- "Kołysanka dla Okruszka"

External links
 opis płyty

Kids
2008 compilation albums
Children's music albums